Jorkyball is a format of two vs two football. As in football it is played only with the feet and use of hands is forbidden. The objective  is to score goals into a net. As in squash and paddle, the sport is played in a four-walled court and all of them can be used including the net above, i.e. there is no  outside. The governing body is the Jorkyball International Federation.

History

Three on two jorkyball was invented by the French Gilles Paniez in 1987. It started in a garage in Lyon, France.  Jorkyball was first played in front of a large audience at the 1990 FIFA World Cup in Italy as an exhibition. Since then, the number of jorkyball players has been increasing.

Jorkyball is currently played in 13 countries and expanding: France, Italy, Portugal, Canada, Spain, Hungary, Poland, Belgium, Switzerland, Japan, Mexico, India and Israel.

Rules
A jorkyball game is played in sets of seven goals each. The first team to reach two sets wins. Each team is made up of one striker and one defender. The striker is not allowed to play in the kickoff areas. At the end of each set, defender and striker change role. The defender is not allowed to play in the opponent's side of the court.

Game elements
The pitch of 2 vs 2 jorkyball is a parallelepiped. Dimensions are:
 Length: 
 Width: 
 Height: 
 Goal size: 

The ball is in hand-sewn felt. It weighs . It is roughly the size of a handball.

References

External links
jorkyball.org
http://lactualite.com/sante-et-science/2016/01/04/y-a-du-mouvement-dans-lair/
http://www.3bble.com/en/3bble-on-fitness-news-july-30-2016-issue-n-12
http://www.sportsmanagement.co.uk/digital/index1.cfm?mag=Sports%20Management&codeid=30371&linktype=story&ref=n

Wall and ball games
Association football variants
Sports originating in France